This is a list of the colonial governors of Louisiana, from the founding of the first settlement by the French in 1699 to the territory's acquisition by the United States in 1803.

The French and Spanish governors administered a territory which was much larger than the modern U.S. state of Louisiana, comprising Louisiana (New France) and Louisiana (New Spain), respectively.

At the same time, there are parts of present-day Louisiana which were historically administered by other European powers, with the most prominent example being the area known as the Florida Parishes, north of Lake Pontchartrain and east of the Mississippi River. This territory was originally part of French Louisiana, but it was administered by the Kingdom of Great Britain for twenty years (1763–83) following the British victory in the French and Indian War.

List

First French Louisiana (1682–1762)

Spanish Louisiana (1762–1802)

Second French Louisiana (1802–1804)

See also 

 List of governors of Louisiana
 List of commandants of the Illinois Country

References
 
 

Lists of American colonial governors
-
Louisiana
Spanish colonial governors and administrators
Governorscolonial
Governorscolonial
Lists of French colonial governors and administrators
People of Louisiana (New France)
Governors of Louisiana